Girl Fight is a 2013 erotic fighting game developed by MicroProse and Kung Fu Factory. It was released on September 24, 2013, for PlayStation 3, and the following day for Xbox 360 Live Arcade. The game received negative reviews from critics, calling it low-budget and poorly made while criticizing its emphasis on sexual aspects.

Reception 
Girl Fight received an aggregate score of 35/100 for the PlayStation 3 version and 34/100 for the Xbox 360 version, both indicating "generally unfavorable reviews".

Nikola Suprak of Hardcore Gamer rated it 2/5 points, calling it "like a dumb version of Dead or Alive". He criticized the enemy AI as "awful" even on the hardest difficulty, and noted a lack of different fighting moves between characters. Heidi Kemps of Official Xbox Magazine rated it 3.5/10 points, calling it "stupefyingly unattractive" and "hilariously un-sexy" despite its supposed emphasis on sex appeal, and calling Skullgirls and Dead or Alive 5 Ultimate "far superior products". Lorenzo Baldo of IGN Italia rated the game 4/10 points, calling it "disgraceful" and immature, and saying that feminists would be right to be angry about the game.

References 

2013 video games
3D fighting games
Erotic video games
Majesco Entertainment games
MicroProse games
Multiplayer and single-player video games
PlayStation 3 games
Xbox 360 Live Arcade games
Kung Fu Factory games